Katarína Lokšová-Ráczová (born 3 October 1950) is a Slovak fencer. She competed in the women's individual foil events at the 1972, 1976 and 1980 Summer Olympics.

References

External links
 

1950 births
Living people
Slovak female foil fencers
Czechoslovak female foil fencers
Olympic fencers of Czechoslovakia
Fencers at the 1972 Summer Olympics
Fencers at the 1976 Summer Olympics
Fencers at the 1980 Summer Olympics
Universiade medalists in fencing
Sportspeople from Košice
Universiade gold medalists for Czechoslovakia